Dong-chul is a Korean masculine given name. The meaning differs based on the hanja used to write each syllable of the name. There are 24 hanja with the reading "dong" and 11 hanja with the reading "chul" on the South Korean government's official list of hanja which may be used in given names.

People with this name include:
Kim Dong Chul (businessman) (born 1953), American citizen held prisoner in North Korea
Shin Dong-Chul (born 1961), South Korean footballer
Kang Dong-chul (born 1979), stage name Brave Brothers, South Korean rapper
Kim Dong-chul (footballer) (born 1990), South Korean footballer
Rim Tong-chol, North Korean politician for Alil, chosen in the 2014 North Korean parliamentary election

Fictional characters with this name include:
Jo Dong-chul from 2013 film The Suspect
Lee Dong-chul from 2008 television series East of Eden
Seok Dong-chul from 2017 television series Save Me

See also
List of Korean given names

References

Korean masculine given names